Kardeş Türküler (translated either as Brotherly Songs or as Ballads of Fraternity) is a contemporary Turkish ethnic/folkloric band. It was formed in 1993 with a series of stage performances given by the music branch of the Folklore Club at Boğaziçi University in Istanbul, Turkey.

Origins
The diverse ethnic groups in this ancient Anatolia region and the Balkans initially gave cause for the concerts to have artists perform interpretations of Anatolian folksongs in Turkish, Arabic, Kurdish, Assyrian, Azerbaijani, Georgian and Armenian. Under the auspices of the Boğaziçi Performing Arts Ensemble (BGST), formed in 1995, the program used the concert stage to advance the ideals of common ancestry and celebration of diversity as a foil to cultural polarization and ethnic tension. Eventually, the musical heritage of the Laz, Georgian, Circassian, Romani, Macedonian and Alevi cultures were all incorporated into the program. The scholarly collection and research of the diverse folklore traditions of the region is an important part of BGST’s activities, but Kardeş Türküler has been intent on forging its own music tradition as well.

Members
The following members have made major contributions to Kardeş Türküler:

Ayhan Akkaya
Aytekin Gazi Ataş
Burak Korucu
Burcu Yankın
Burcu Yıldız
Diler Özer
Evren Bay
Emin Çiftçi
Erol Mutlu
Fehmiye Çelik
Feryal Öney
İlkem Balseçen
Neriman Güneş
Nevzat Çelebi
Ozan E. Aksoy
Özgür Akgül
Saro Usta
Soner Akalin
Selda Öztürk
Şenay Karaman
Şirin Özgün
Tolgahan Çoğulu
Ülker Uncu
Vedat Yıldırım
Yücel Balım

Discography 
	

Soundtracks
January 2001: Vizontele - Soundtrack of a popular film directed by Yılmaz Erdoğan and Ömer Faruk Sorak
January 2004: Vizontele Tuuba - Soundtrack about sequel film directed by Yılmaz Erdoğan about the music and cultures of Anatolia and Mesopotamia. Yılmaz Erdoğan

Others
June 2013: "Tencere Tava Havası" (meaning "Sound of Pots and Pans"), a street performance as a criticism of Turkish Prime Minister Erdoğan's response to ongoing passive protests involving people banging silverware to pans and pots released on their official YouTube channel.

Collaborations with other artists
Kardeş Türküler has worked with a number of leading international artists, notably the Armenian musicians Arto Tunçboyacıyan and Ara Dinkjian and the Palestinian Reem Kelani. Both Arto Tunçboyacıyan and Reem Kelani appeared together with Kardeş Türküler in their June 2009 concert at the Turkcell Kuruçesme Arena, Istanbul.
In 2013, Kardeş Türküler and Tunçboyacıyan released a joint album.
In April 2014, Kardeş Türküler and Reem Kelani gave a joint concert at TIM Maslak in Istanbul  which attracted considerable interest in the Turkish media.
Kardeş Türküler will also be touring in 2014 with the leading Turkish pop singer, Sezen Aksu.

References

External links 
Kardeş Türküler website
 Bogazici Performing Arts Ensemble

Turkish musical groups
Best Music Score Golden Orange Award winners
Musical groups from Istanbul